Luna ("Moon") is a Soviet popular science and science fiction film directed by Pavel Klushantsev.

Story 
The first part of the film — popular science — tells of recent (mid-1960s) achievements in the exploration of the Moon. Scientists discuss the hypothesis of the origin of the lunar maria, about the temperature of the lunar surface and the supposed properties of the lunar soil.

The second part of the film — science fiction — shows how the Moon in the near future will be developed by people from a hypothetical first lunar mission to lunar cities and laboratories.

Honors 

The film won the "Golden Seal of Trieste" at the IV International Science-Fiction Film Festival (Italy, 1966).

Crew 

 Written and directed by — Pavel Klushantsev
 Operator — Arkady Klimov
 Artist — Yuri Shvets
 Animation director — G. Ershov
 Composer — Alexander Chernov

Scientists involved 

 N. P. Barabashev - Scientific Consultant
 V. A. Fedoretc
 A. V. Markov - Scientific Consultant
 V. L. Kozlov
 M. N. Markov
 V. S. Troitsky - Scientific Consultant
 V. V. Sharonov - Scientific Consultant
  - Scientific Consultant
 A. V. Povalyaev - Scientific Consultant

Artistic features 

Filmed in typical Pavel Klushantsev manner synthesizing two genres: popular science movies and science-fiction fantasy. In the second, "science-fiction" part of the film, animation and trick photography are applied.

Technical data 
 Ratio 1.33:1
 Color
 50 minutes

References

External links 

 Е. В. Харитонов, А. В. Щербак-Жуков: Луна at "Fandom"
 Луна entry in online "Encyclopedia of Russian cinema"
 
 

1960s science fiction films
Soviet science fiction films
Moon in film
Films directed by Pavel Klushantsev
Soviet popular science films